Lurdes Yoshiko Tani Inoue is a Brazilian-born statistician of Japanese descent, who specializes in Bayesian inference. She works as a professor of biostatistics in the University of Washington School of Public Health.

Education and career
Inoue's grandparents emigrated from Japan to Brazil in the 1930s; she was born in São Paulo, where she grew up.

She earned bachelor's and master's degree from the University of São Paulo in 1992 and 1995, and received a fellowship from the Brazilian government to continue her studies in the US. She completed her Ph.D. in statistics in 1999 from Duke University, under the supervision of Don Berry.

After postdoctoral research at the University of Texas, she joined the University of Washington in 2002. In 2019, she became the chair of the biostatistics department.

Book
With Giovanni Parmigiani, she is the author of the book Decision Theory: Principles and Approaches (Wiley, 2009). This book won the DeGroot Prize of the International Society for Bayesian Analysis for 2009.

Recognition
In 2014, Inoue was elected as a Fellow of the American Statistical Association "for substantial and fundamental contributions to Bayesian decision theory and innovation in the statistical modeling of disease progression with applications to cancer research; for outstanding mentoring of junior researchers; and for exemplary service to the profession."

References

Year of birth missing (living people)
Living people
American statisticians
Brazilian statisticians
Women statisticians
Biostatisticians
Brazilian people of Japanese descent
American academics of Japanese descent
University of São Paulo alumni
University of Washington faculty
Fellows of the American Statistical Association